American Eaglet may refer to:

American Eagle Eaglet, a 1930 two-seat, low-cost monoplane
AmEagle American Eaglet, a 1975 single-seat, ultralight sailplane